Striding Into the Wind is a 2020 Chinese road movie directed by Wei Shujun.

References

External links 

 

2020s road movies
Chinese comedy films